Tsia or TSIA may refer to:

Chokha or tsia, a traditional woolen coat of the peoples of the Caucasus
Xie (surname), a Chinese surname sometimes romanised as Tsia
Tsia language, a Papuan language spoken in Morabe Province, Papua New Guinea
4105 Tsia, a minor planet named for the Zia people
The Scottish International Airshow, an annual air show founded in 2014
Tsia Creek, a tributary of the Liard River of North America
Tsia River, in Kolkheti National Park in the country of Georgia

See also
Zia people (New Mexico), a tribe of the indigenous Keres Pueblo peoples
Tsai, a surname
Stia, Tuscany, Italy